Eddie is a text editor which was first released in 1997 for BeOS, and later ported to Linux and macOS. It was written by Pavel Císler, formerly a senior developer at Be, who later worked for Eazel and currently works for Apple and continues to develop Eddie as his pet project, now on macOS. Inspired by the classic Mac OS Macintosh Programmer's Workshop editor, it is primarily intended for working with C and C++ development. However, Eddie supports syntax colouring for HTML, JavaScript, .kon/.widget, Perl, and many other formats. Eddie supports a Worksheet – provides a well-appointed shell that enables the power of bash and the convenience of editing in a normal text window mode.

Plugins
 Autocompletion
 BeApiFetch
 beide
Allows the BeIDE key bindings to be used under Eddie.
 HeaderGuard
 Magic Prototyper 
Allows the writing  class definitions and corresponding  declarations to be easier - it manages the  copy-paste actions you normally have to perform when filling out the implementation of  class methods. It is even more useful when writing class  template methods, saving three or more  copy-paste operations per method.

See also
List of text editors
Comparison of text editors

External links
Home Page
Eddie at Macupdate
Eddie at Softpedia
Dan Sandler's Eddie package for  Vim

BeOS text editors
MacOS text editors
Linux text editors